The European University of Brittany (French Université européenne de Bretagne), located in Rennes, France, was a center for higher education, academic research and doctoral studies located over multiple campuses in the Academie de Rennes. It includes a doctoral college that federates university institutes, engineering schools and research centres.

Members
 University of Western Brittany
 University of Southern Brittany
 University of Rennes 1
 University of Rennes 2 – Upper Brittany
 AGROCAMPUS OUEST
 École Normale Supérieure de Cachan's Ker Lann campus
 École nationale supérieure de chimie de Rennes
 INSA Rennes
 TELECOM Bretagne
 European Academy of Art in Brittany (EESAB)
 ECAM Rennes
 EME Rennes
 ESC Rennes School of Business

University associations and consortia in France
Education in Brittany
Educational institutions established in 2007
2007 establishments in France